The 2005–06 Baltic Men Volleyball League, known as Schenker League for sponsorship reasons, was the inaugural edition of the highest level of club volleyball in the Baltic states.

Participating teams

Main Tournament
All participating 12 clubs were playing according to the double round robin system.

|}
Updated to match(es) played on 26 February 2006. Source: Schenker League

Final Four III
Organizer: Cēsis/Cēsu Alus 
Venue: Cēsis, Latvia

Final Four II
Organizer: Falck Pärnu 
Venue: Pärnu, Estonia

Final Four I
Organizer: Rīga/LU Inčukalns 
Venue: Rīga, Latvia

Semifinals

|}

3rd place match

|}

Final

|}

Final ranking

References

2005–06 Main Tournament table

External links
Official website  

Baltic Men Volleyball League
2005 in volleyball
2006 in volleyball
2005 in Estonian sport
2006 in Estonian sport
2005 in Latvian sport
2006 in Latvian sport